Congregation of the Damned is the fifth studio album by American metalcore band Atreyu. It was released through Hollywood Records and Roadrunner Records on October 27, 2009.

The album debuted at No. 18 on the Billboard 200, selling 26,000 copies in its first week of release.  The album has sold 121,000 copies in the United States as of August 2015.

Composition

Influences, style and themes
For Congregation of the Damned, Atreyu expressed an interest in returning to their "heavy hardcore" roots, following 2007's Lead Sails Paper Anchor, while also wanting to "move forward." Comparing the new album to Lead Sails, drummer Brandon Saller stated that "there were parts of 'Atreyu' missing and that we needed back, so we've brought them back." He also went on to claim that the band had been "reflecting on how far we've come and where from. It's stepping forward to new territory but taking with us the best of where we've been." Similarly, lead singer Alex Varkatzas claimed that the record is a "mix of everything we've ever done. For every song that's more melodic or rock-driven there's a total shitkicker, and I think that's what makes us a well-rounded band."

The album was produced by Bob Marlette, who has previously worked such artists as Ozzy Osbourne and Airbourne, and it was mixed by Rich Costey who has worked with The Mars Volta, System of a Down and Rage Against the Machine.

When speaking about lyrical themes, Alex Varkatzas claimed that since "The music is heavier, I was able to write darker lyrics." He went on to state that the "personal" material encompasses themes such as "self-doubt" and "self-loathing", and claimed that "I'm not singing about dark things to promote them, I'm singing about them so I don't go insane. It's pure catharsis. I make music so I don't go crazy." On the matter of lyrics, Brandon Saller, claimed that "a lot of them are in a similar vein" to the band's 2004 album The Curse, but without the "vampire stuff."

On the subject of the album's title, Varkatzas stated:

Promotion
The band started a co-headlining tour with Hollywood Undead and Escape the Fate in October 2009, and as promotion of album have debuted songs like "Bleeding Is a Luxury" at K-Rockathon 14 in New York State Fairgrounds, Syracuse, NY., and "Gallows". Atreyu has also promoted their new album in many other ways. For example, 5 webisodes, between September 1 to October 20 every two weeks, have been released advertising the album. They describe the album to "Make more sense than the other ones because they finally realize what they are."

They have also released two songs on their Myspace, "Stop! Before It's Too Late and We've Destroyed It All" and "Storm to Pass", on September 13 and September 15, 2009, respectively; "Storm to Pass" was also their first US Radio single from Congregation of the Damned. "Gallows" was later released on October 20 in a promotional game entitled Metal Head Zombies, which is a first-person shooter loosely based on Call of Duty.

Dan Jacobs and Travis Miguel also appeared in Issue 5 of the Eternal Descent comic book series, which featured a narrative inspired by the song "Black Days Begin" from Congregation of the Damned.

The song "Ravenous" features on the music video game, Guitar Hero: Warriors of Rock.

Atreyu began their The Congregation of the Damned Tour with Blessthefall, Chiodos, Architects, and Endless Hallway on October 20 in Anaheim, CA.

Track listing

Personnel
Atreyu
 Alex Varkatzas – lead vocals, lyrics
 Dan Jacobs – lead guitar
 Travis Miguel – rhythm guitar
 Marc McKnight – bass guitar
 Brandon Saller – drums, percussion, clean vocals

Production
 Produced by Bob Marlette
 Tracks 1, 2, 3, 4, 5, 7, 12 and 13 mixed by Rich Costey
 Tracks 6, 8, 9, 10 and 11 mixed by Noah Shain
 Track 8 mixed by Sonny Moore

Charts

References

Atreyu (band) albums
2009 albums
Hollywood Records albums
Albums produced by Bob Marlette